Wachenheim is a small town in the Bad Dürkheim district in Rhineland-Palatinate, Germany.

Wachenheim may also refer to:

Places:
 Wachenheim, Alzey-Worms, a municipality belonging to a Verbandsgemeinde, a kind of collective municipality – in the Alzey-Worms district in Rhineland-Palatinate, Germany
 Wachenheim (Verbandsgemeinde), Bad Dürkheim, Rhineland-Palatinate, Germany

People:

 Edgar Wachenheim III, American investor
 Michel Wachenheim, French ambassador